Coquelicot is a shade of red. The term was originally a French vernacular name for the wild corn poppy, Papaver rhoeas, which is distinguished by its bright red color, and orange tint. It eventually passed into English usage as the name of a color based upon that of the flower. The first recorded use of this usage was in the year 1795.  

Claude Monet painted Les Coquelicots or Poppies Blooming in 1873.

See also
 List of colors

References

 

Shades of red
Shades of orange